The Telia Challenge Waxholm was a golf tournament on the Challenge Tour 1990–1991 and 1996–2007 and the Swedish Golf Tour from 1985. It was always played in Sweden.

Winners

Notes

References

External links
Official coverage on the Challenge Tour's official site

Former Challenge Tour events
Swedish Golf Tour events
Golf tournaments in Sweden
Recurring sporting events established in 1985
Recurring sporting events disestablished in 2007
1985 establishments in Sweden
2007 disestablishments in Sweden
Defunct sports competitions in Sweden